Constant Hot Water is a British sitcom written by Colin Pearson. Six episodes were broadcast from 10 January to 14 February 1986 on ITV. Every episode was broadcast on Friday nights at 8:30pm, and lasted 25 minutes.

Synopsis 
Constant Hot Water starred popular British actresses Pat Phoenix and Prunella Gee, who played rival landladies, Phyllis Nugent (Phoenix) and Miranda Thorpe (Gee), in the seaside town of Bridlington.

Busybody Phyllis, who is prim and proper, strongly objects to the arrival of glamorous widow Miranda, who has opened up her house next door as a rival B&B. All the men fancy Miranda, but Phyllis believes that she is a 'loose woman', and lowers the tone of the neighbourhood, even accusing her of running a brothel.

Production 
The hotel used for filming of the series was the Leeds House Guest House in Bridlington.

Constant Hot Water's theme song was provided by comedy musical cabaret group Instant Sunshine.

Reception
The series was critically unsuccessful, and in 2003, it was number 6 in the list of the worst British sitcoms in the Radio Times Guide to TV Comedy. The British Comedy Guide described the humour as "erratic", and added that the show "rarely rose above the mundane".

However, the ratings, while not stellar, were over 9.3 million for each episode, and a second series was reputedly planned, though did not materialise. On an episode of Wogan (27 June 1986), star Pat Phoenix said that no matter what the critical response was, 'the public seemed to like it, and we are doing another series this autumn with new writers and a lot of new ideas in it.'

Constant Hot Water was never released on video, and it remains unreleased on DVD.

Cast 
 Pat Phoenix (billed as Patricia Phoenix) - Phyllis Nugent
 Prunella Gee - Miranda Thorpe
 Steve Alder - Frank Osbourne
 Roger Kemp - Norman Nugent
 Mohammed Ashiq (Ash Varrez) - Trevor
 Kevin Lloyd - Jeff
 Al Ashton - Brian
 Joe McPartland - Paddy
 Tricia Walsh-Smith - Linda

Episodes

References

External links

1986 British television series debuts
1986 British television series endings
1980s British sitcoms
ITV sitcoms
Television series by ITV Studios
English-language television shows
Television shows produced by Central Independent Television